Hell Squad (also known as Commando Squad and Commando Girls) is a 1985 action film. The film features a group of Las Vegas showgirls who aim to rescue the son of a diplomat.

References

External links
 
 

1985 films
1985 action films
American action films
American independent films
Films shot in the Las Vegas Valley
Films set in the Las Vegas Valley
Girls with guns films
Golan-Globus films
1980s feminist films
1980s English-language films
1980s American films
1985 independent films